The women's 1000 metres race of the 2013–14 ISU Speed Skating World Cup 2, arranged in the Utah Olympic Oval, in Salt Lake City, United States, was held on November 17, 2013.

Brittany Bowe of the United States won the race, setting a new world record of 1:12.58 in the process, with fellow American Heather Richardson finishing in second place, only 3/100 of a second behind, and Ireen Wüst of the Netherlands in third place. Richardson, who skated in a later pair, also went below the old record. Kim Hyun-yung of South Korea broke the girls' world record with a time of 1:14.95. Yekaterina Malysheva of Russia won the Division B race.

Results
The race took place on Sunday, November 17, with Division B scheduled in the morning session, at 11:27, and Division A scheduled in the afternoon session, at 14:04.

Division A

Division B

References

Women 1000
2